Collignon is a surname, and may refer to:

 Charles Collignon (fencer), French fencer and 1908 Olympic champion
Charles Collignon (surgeon) (1725–1785), British surgeon and professor of anatomy at Cambridge University
 Christophe Collignon (b. 1969), Belgian politician
 Claude Boniface Collignon (d. 1819), French proponent of decimal time and metric system
 Daphné Collignon (born 1977), French comic book author
 Édouard Collignon (1831–1913), French engineer and scientist
 François Collignon (c. 1609–1687), French engraver
 Frédéric Collignon (b. 1975), Belgian table football player 
Giuseppe Collignon (1778–1863), Italian neoclassical painter 
Jacques Collignon (b. 1936), French Olympic swimmer 
 Jean Nicolas Collignon (1762–?1788), French botanist
Maurice Collignon (1893–1978), French geologist and paleontologist
Maxime Collignon (1849–1917), French archaeologist
 Médéric Collignon (born 1970),  French musician

See also
 Collignon projection, pseudocylindrical map projection first known to be published by Édouard Collignon in 1865